Sanbot is an intelligent, cloud-enabled service robot developed by Qihan Technology Co. Ltd., a robotics and AI company headquartered in Shenzhen, China. Qihan has launched three generations of intelligent robots under the Sanbot brand – Sanbot Elf(QIHAN Technology renamed the first generation Sanbot to Sanbot Elf), Sanbot King Kong and Sanbot Nano.

Development history

Sanbot utilizes robotics and artificial intelligent (AI) technologies both in design and manufacture. It has an open API platform which enables developers to program the robot with customized Android applications for their business.
Sanbot Elf open platform robot is a Hardware-App-Cloud service combined three-in-one customized open system, which offers directional solutions for home and commercial users in Retail, Hospitality, Education, Healthcare, and Security areas. Sanbot was released at the IFA 2016 in Berlin.

Sanbot Elf is in use by customs and airports including Gongbei Port of Entry and Shenzhen Bao'an International Airport for passenger service and security purposes.

Sanbot releases MPS (Multi-service Platform System) specially for business including retail, hospitality, education and healthcare. MPS enables businesses to centrally manage hundreds of Sanbot robots from anywhere through the cloud-enabled, centralized system.

QIHAN Technology launched new generation humanoid robot - Sanbot King Kong at the 2017 World Robot Conference in Beijing and was presented to the North American market at CES 2018. Sanbot King Kong can move at speeds up to five meters per second, exceeding the average human walking speed (1.5 meters per second) and able to tow up to 165 pounds. Sanbot King Kong aims to bring endless possibilities to government, hospitality, public service and retail industries.

Sanbot Nano is Qihan’s new generation intelligent robot for home use and it was launched at 2017 IFA Expo in Messe Berlin, Germany. Sanbot Nano adopts Amazon’s Alexa Voice Service (AVS) and families can use it to control lights, thermostats and home appliances. People can order pizza, request a car, track fitness stats, control the TV, play music from today’s leading streaming providers through Sanbot Nano at home.

Design

Sanbot Elf
A matrix design of 360 wrap-around perception that utilizes more than 60 sensors gives Sanbot Elf better than human-like awareness. The robot has the capacity for Voice Interaction, Facial Recognition, Voice Localization, Video Chat, Obstacle Avoidance and Auto charging, giving users feeling of Magic Audio-visual.

Sanbot robot adopts components and systems from international hi-tech giants for its hardware and intelligent software. The forward-sensing cameras is from Sony, touchscreen from Sharp, IBM Watson powers the artificial intelligence capabilities, and Nuance provides the voice recognition.

Sanbot King Kong

EXTERNAL HARDWARE: Standing at approximately 4.8 feet tall, Sanbot King Kong boasts two new bionic arms and hands that provide several degrees of freedom, similar to that of a human arm. Its waist can automatically change the body’s center of gravity and adjust its posture, so that it can perform well in hospitality services including food delivery and prevents it from falling over when carrying objects on uneven terrain. Sanbot King Kong features the advanced four-wheel drive system with an external wheel motor and Mecanum wheel chassis design and can move at speeds up to five meters per second. Sanbot King Kong is able to tow up to 165 pounds during the sophisticated movements.

INTERNAL HARDWARE: Sanbot King Kong wields six built-in microphones in its head and it has a strong speech recognition program that separates background noise in busy and loud areas. With AI system powered by IBM Watson and Nuance, Sanbot King Kong is capable of speech recognition technology and can identify and communicate in 26 different languages. Sanbot  King Kong adopts multiple 3D cameras vSLAM (vision simultaneous localization and mapping), combining infrared, ultrasound and visual obstacle avoidance technology to help Sanbot King Kong efficiently map out unfamiliar environments and even avoid glass doors and falling objects. Sanbot King Kong is fused with security password system on its head to protect the robot from unwanted access to its multiple USB ports and power-supply ports.

Sanbot Nano
Sanbot Nano stands at 2.7 feet tall and is equipped with over 50 sensors to avoid objects in its way, recognize voices and know when someone enters the room. 
Sanbot Nano inherits popular features from Sanbot Elf including the Android SDK, Sanbot App Store and automatic charging. It adopts Amazon’s Alexa (Alexa Voice Service) and families can use it to control lights, thermostats and home appliances. It is the first home robot adopting the Amazon Alexa AI system.

Specifications

See also 

Robot
Service robot
Manav (robot)
Musio
Pepper (robot)
Nao (robot)
Educational robotics
Justin (robot)
Surena (robot)

References

External links
 Official website
 Official UK website

Robots of China
Humanoid robots
Personal assistant robots
Rolling robots
Service robots
2016 robots
Projects established in 2016